Stok Lacki-Folwark  is a village in the administrative district of Gmina Siedlce, within Siedlce County, Masovian Voivodeship, in east-central Poland.

The village has a population of 853.

References

Stok Lacki-Folwark